Pleystein is a municipality  in the district of Neustadt an der Waldnaab, in Bavaria, Germany. It is situated 18 km east of Weiden in der Oberpfalz, and 11 km west of Rozvadov.

References

Neustadt an der Waldnaab (district)